Dulari Devi Khatweni (Nepali: दुलारी देवी खतवेनी) (also Dulari Devi Khanga, Dularidevi Khatweni or Dularidevi Khanga) is a Nepali politician and a member of the House of Representatives of the federal parliament of Nepal. She was elected under the proportional representation system from Rastriya Janata Party Nepal. She is also a member of the House Education and Health Committee.

References

Living people
21st-century Nepalese women politicians
21st-century Nepalese politicians
Rastriya Janata Party Nepal politicians
Place of birth missing (living people)
Nepal MPs 2017–2022
Terai Madhesh Loktantrik Party politicians
People's Socialist Party, Nepal politicians
Loktantrik Samajwadi Party, Nepal politicians
1971 births